The women's light heavyweight (65 kg/143 lbs) K-1 category at the W.A.K.O. World Championships 2007 in Belgrade was the third heaviest of the female K-1 tournaments.  There were just three women present at the competition, all based in Europe.  Each of the matches was three rounds of two minutes each and were fought under K-1 rules.  

Due to the low level of competitors, one of the women received a bye straight through to the final.  In the end it was Belarus's Ala Ivashkevich who won gold, defeating Russian Elena Solareva in the final.  The tournaments only other fighter, Jelena Djuric from Serbia, received the bronze medal.

Results

See also
List of WAKO Amateur World Championships
List of WAKO Amateur European Championships
List of female kickboxers

References

External links
 WAKO World Association of Kickboxing Organizations Official Site

Kickboxing events at the WAKO World Championships 2007 Belgrade
2007 in kickboxing
Kickboxing in Serbia